Lake Wildwood may refer to:

 Lake Wildwood, California
 Lake Wildwood, Georgia
 Lake Wildwood, Illinois